Warwick Castle, in  Warwickshire, UK, was first constructed in 1068. Over its 950 years of history it has been owned by 36 different individuals, plus four periods as crown property under seven different monarchs. It was the family seat of three separate creations of the Earls of Warwick, and has been a family home for members of the Beaumont, Beauchamp, Neville, Plantagenet, Dudley and Greville families. The first creation of the Earldom, in 1088, specifically included the right of inheritance through the female line, so the castle three times had a woman (or girl) as the owner. Eleven of the owners were under 20 when they inherited, including a girl aged two and a boy aged three. At least three owners died in battle, two were executed and one was murdered.

Various owners have entertained royalty at the castle, under very different circumstances. Henry II tricked his way into the castle, Edward IV was held prisoner in it. Elizabeth I, William III and Victoria all made state visits.

Every century except the 21st has seen major building work or adaptations at the castle. For 100 years it was an earth mound and timber buildings. The next 300 years saw the building of the external walls and towers in stone. During the 210 years between 1500 and 1710 the living areas were transformed from medieval fortress rooms to a stately residence with elegant state rooms. In the 18th and 19th centuries the living areas were further adapted, the grounds were laid out and furnishings were acquired in great quantity. The 20th century saw the transition from aristocratic home to visitor attraction.

Table of owners

See also
Earl of Warwick
List of castles in England
Castles in Great Britain and Ireland

References

Bibliography

Warwick
Greville family
Dudley family